Kristofer "Kris" Cooke (born January 19, 1988) is a former American football defensive tackle who played in the Arena Football League.

High school 
Cooke played defensive tackle, offensive tackle, linebacker and fullback at Homewood-Flossmoor High School. He was named all-area as senior after recording 80 tackles, including 13 sacks, with five pass breakups and three fumble recoveries. He recorded 62 tackles, including seven sacks, during his junior year en route to earning all-conference honors. Cooke moved up to varsity in his sophomore year to play for coach Tom Bailey. As a sophomore, he racked up 35 tackles, including five sacks. Cooke was team captain in his junior and senior seasons. He also participated in weight-lifting competitions and track and field.

College 
Cooke appeared in one game in 2006 for Northern Illinois versus Ohio on September 9 and recorded one tackle. After one season at Northern Illinois, Cooke transferred to Joliet Junior College, where he was a second team All-American and first team all-conference, and conference defensive MVP in 2007 after recording 30 tackles, including four sacks, with two pass breakups and one forced fumble.

Cooke appeared in eight games as reserve and on special teams during 2008 season for Purdue Boilermakers during Joe Tiller's final year as Purdue head coach. Cooke recorded seven tackles (2 solo, 5 assists) including season-high three tackles at Northwestern on October 18 (1 solo, 2 assists) and at Michigan State on November 8 (all assists).

Professional career

Georgia Force 
Debuted for the Georgia Force, of the Arena Football League, during 2012 season as starting nose tackle. Cooke attended an open tryout for the Force in August 2011 and drew the attention of head coach Dean Cokinos. He was invited to the February 2012 training camp on a 2-day waiver. Cooke proved himself to the Force coaching staff and signed with the team. He earned a starting position at nose tackle by week six of the 2012 season and helped the team achieve a victory against the previously unbeaten, Chicago Rush, one week after the Force's devastating and record-breaking 92-42 loss to the Philadelphia Soul.

Cleveland Gladiators 
Cooke signed with the Cleveland Gladiators, of the Arena Football League for the 2013 season. Cooke was placed on retirement on January 21, 2014.

References

External links
Georgia Force profile
Purdue Profile

1988 births
Living people
People from Blue Island, Illinois
Players of American football from Illinois
American football defensive tackles
Northern Illinois Huskies football players
Purdue Boilermakers football players
Georgia Force players
Cleveland Gladiators players
Homewood-Flossmoor High School alumni